Saint Tropez is a Danish fashion brand. It is now owned by DK Company.

History
Saint Tropez was founded by Niels-Henrik Henriksen in 1984. The company was acquired by IC Companys with effect from 1 January 2002. In January 2019, IC Group sold Saint Tropez to DK Company.

Organisation
Sofie Lindahl-Jessen replaced Hans-Petersen as CEO of Saint Tropez in 2017. She came from a position as Executive Vice President for Sales and Brand Communication at Republic of Fritz Hansen. Anna Juul Jepsen has been design manager since 2016.

Distribution
Saint Tropez operates 38 Saint Tropez stores in Denmark (2017). Products are also sold as wholesale and through online sale to consumers.

Saint Tropez stores
 Aarhus
 Copenhagen
 City centre (Vimmelskaftet 43, Købmagergade 42 and Magasin du Nord)
 Amager (Amagerbrogade 46 and Copenhagen Airport)
 Frederiksberg (Frederiksberg Centret)
 Glostrup (Glostrup Storcenter)
 Greve Strand (Waves)
 Herlev (Herlev Torv)
 Kongens Lyngby (Lyngby Storcenter and Magasin Lyngby)
 Østerbro (Østerbrogade 68)
 Rødovre (Rødovre Centrum)
 Vesterbro (Fisketorvet)
 Esbjerg
 Frederikssund
 Gilleleje
 Køge
 Kolding
 Helsingør
 Hillerød
 Næstved
 Odense
 Ringsted
 Roskilde
 Vejle

References

External links
 Official website

Clothing brands
Clothing brands of Denmark
Clothing companies of Denmark
Clothing retailers of Denmark
Clothing companies based in Copenhagen
Companies based in Copenhagen Municipality
Danish companies established in 1984